41 Aurigae is a binary star system located around 310–316 light years away from the Sun in the northern constellation of Auriga. It is visible to the naked eye as a dim, white-hued star with a combined apparent visual magnitude of 5.83. This system is moving further from the Earth with a heliocentric radial velocity of 31 km/s. It is a probable member of the Hyades Supercluster.

As of 2012, the pair had an angular separation of  along a position angle of 357.7°. The primary component is an A-type main-sequence star with a stellar classification of A2Va+ and a visual magnitude of 6.15. The magnitude 6.84 secondary companion is a possible Am star with a stellar classification of kA5hA5mF0(IV-V), showing the calcium K line and hydrogen lines of an A5 star and the metal lines of an F0 star.

References

A-type main-sequence stars
Am stars
Binary stars
Hyades Stream
Auriga (constellation)
Durchmusterung objects
Aurigae, 41
042126
029388
2175